Suraya binti Yaacob is a Malaysian politician who has served as Political Secretary to the Minister in the Prime Minister's Department in charge of Law and Institutional Reforms Azalina Othman Said since January 2023 and Member of the Kedah State Legislative Assembly (MLA) for Sungai Tiang since March 2004. She served as Member of the Kedah State Executive Council (EXCO) in the Barisan Nasional (BN) state administration under former Menteris Besar Mukhriz Mahathir and Ahmad Bashah Md Hanipah from May 2013 to the collapse of the BN state administration in May 2018 and again in the Perikatan Nasional (PN) state administration under Menteri Besar Muhammad Sanusi Md Nor from May 2020 to her resignation in October 2022. She is a member of the United Malays National Organisation (UMNO), a component party of the ruling BN coalition. She has served as the State Deputy Chairwoman of UMNO of Kedah since December 2022 and the Division Chief of UMNO of Pendang. She also previously served as the State Information Chief of UMNO of Kedah before her promotion to the state deputy chairwomanship.

Election Results

Honours
  :
  Commander of the Order of Meritorious Service (PJN) - Datuk (2012)
  :
  Knight Companion of the Order of Loyalty to the Royal House of Kedah (DSDK) - Dato' (2014)

References 

Living people
People from Kedah
Malaysian people of Malay descent
Malaysian Muslims
21st-century Malaysian politicians
Malaysian United Indigenous Party politicians
Members of the Kedah State Legislative Assembly
Kedah state executive councillors
1969 births
Commanders of the Order of Meritorious Service